William Lambert was the Engrosser or Penman of the United States Bill of Rights whose hand-written copy of the Bill of Rights hangs in the US National Archives.

William Lambert served as a congressional clerk at the time of the drafting of the Bill of Rights.

During the 1820s, Lambert was a member of the prestigious society, Columbian Institute for the Promotion of Arts and Sciences, who counted among their members former presidents Andrew Jackson and John Quincy Adams and many prominent men of the day, including well-known military representatives, government service persons, medical practitioners, and practitioners of other professions.

See also
A More Perfect Union, 1989 film
Constitution Day (United States)
Constitution of the United States
History of the United States Constitution
History of the United States
National Constitution Center
United States Bill of Rights

References

External links
 National Park Service "Text and History of Constitution" 

Drafting of the United States Constitution
Year of birth missing
Year of death missing